Jean Larrivée Guitars Inc. is a Canadian company that manufactures electric and acoustic guitars. Founded in 1967 by Jean Larrivée, the company moved from Toronto, Ontario, to Victoria, British Columbia, in 1977, and to Vancouver in 1982. A second plant opened in California in September 2001. Canadian manufacturing was closed in 2013.

History 
Jean Larrivée began a guitar building apprenticeship with Edgar Moench Sr. in Toronto, Canada, and built his first two Larrivée-style guitars. The first Larrivée guitars were based on European classical guitar designs and became part of the Larrivée family collection.

The company was founded in Toronto, Ontario, in 1967 and moved to Victoria, British Columbia, in 1977, and to Vancouver in 1982. In September 2001, Larrivée opened a second plant in California. However, in November 2013 Larrivée announced that it would be consolidating its Canadian division and closing its Vancouver factory.

In 1971 Larrivee began adding inlay designs to their guitars and in 1977 inlays became a standard for their guitars. Beginning in 1978 their inlay designs took on a more romantic style. Since 1979 all engravings were designed by Wendy Larrivée except for a 1998 inlay called "The Joker". In 2007 Larrivée began using laser engraving for their inlays.

Chris Hadfield performed a cover of David Bowie's "Space Oddity" on a Larrivée parlor guitar while in orbit on the International Space Station.

Models 

 03 Recording Series
 40 Legacy Series
 04 Performer Series
 05 Mahogany Select Series
 09 Rosewood Artist Series
 10 Rosewood Deluxe Series
 11 Fingerstyle Series
 50 Mahogany Traditional Series
 60 Rosewood Traditional Series
 30 Series classical guitars

Body Styles 

 P - Parlor
 PV - Venetian cutaway parlor
 OM - Orchestra model
 OMV - Venetian cutaway OM
 LS -Larrivée small body
 LSV - Venetian cutaway small body
 L - Larrivée body
 LV - Venetian cutaway L-body
 C - Florentine cutaway (L - body)
 D - Dreadnought
 DV - Venetian dreadnought
 J - Jumbo
 JV - Venetian jumbo
 LJ - Larrivée jumbo
 LJV - Venetian LJ
 0 - Single "O"
 00 - Double "O"
 000 - Triple "O"
 SO - Slope OM - same as 000
 SD - Slope dreadnought

The 03 Recording Series features all wood construction without the inlays and high gloss finishes. All models are now produced in the California facility.

Model history

All models 
(in numerical order):
01, 02, 03, 04, 05, 07, 09, 10, 11, 19, 20, 27, 28, 30, 31, 35, 38, 40, 41, 42, 45, 48, 50, 60, 70, 72, 78

Description 

 01, 02, 03, 04 = all satin models with 04 having gloss tops
 05 = glossy mahogany
 07, 09, 11 = glossy rosewood.
 19 = glossy rosewood. 
 27 = same as 19 but in cutaway version
 10 = glossy rosewood. 
 20 = koa guitar with eagle inlay and feather fingerboard and bridge wing inlays. 
 28 = same as 10 but cutaway version
 30 = nylon string classic in both L body and C cutaway
 31, 35 = nylon string classic
 38 = nylon string cutaway
 40 = Legacy Series featuring asymmetrical bracing 
 41 = 12 string "19" version
 42 = 12 string "10" version
 45 = 12 string "10" version
 48 = 12 presentation model. 
 50 = Traditional Series mahogany
 60 = Traditional Series rosewood
 70 = large sound hole "19" style
 72 = presentation model.
 78 = cutaway version of "72"

References

External links
 
 NAMM Oral History Interview with Jean Larrivee July 28, 2007

Guitar manufacturing companies
Musical instrument manufacturing companies of Canada
Musical instrument manufacturing companies of the United States
Manufacturing companies based in Vancouver